Muritaia suba is a species of araneomorphae spider of the family Amaurobiidae, endemic to New Zealand. Its cephalothorax, legs, and chelicerae are a pale reddish brown, while the abdomen is pale yellow brown and has irregular black shading down the dorsal surface.

References 

Spiders of New Zealand
Amaurobiidae
Spiders described in 1927